Freedom Firm is a non-profit human rights organization based in India. Created in 2006 by a small group, with the mission of rescuing sex trafficked girls, restoring their identity and seeking justice against those responsible.

Former International Justice Mission Director in Mumbai for 5 years, attorney Greg Malstead and his wife Mala decided to take that experience and apply it to other areas of high trafficking in India thus creating Freedom Firm. With a base of operations in South India and a staff of 24, Freedom Firm rescues girls throughout India  and continues to bring justice to areas where little work is being done.

Human trafficking in Southeast Asia
According to the Trafficking in Persons report of 2009 India is on the Tier 2 Watch List for the sixth straight year. The Tier 2 Watch List is designated by the following characteristics: the number of victims is “very significant or is significantly increasing; or there is a failure to provide evidence of increasing efforts to combat severe forms of trafficking in persons from the previous year;” yet the country has made significant commitments for future compliance with the minimum standards set forth by the Trafficking and Violence Protection Act of 2000, TVPA.

Despite straightforward penalties for trafficking proscribed by the Indian Penal Code, as well as the Immoral Trafficking Prevention Act of 1956 and the passage of the Child Labor Act of 1986, corruption in India has presented a frequent roadblock. “Insufficient or inadequate laws, poor enforcement, ineffective penalties, minimal chance of prosecution ... corruption and complacency, invisibility of the issue, the failure of governments to implement policies and provide adequate services for victims – all play a role in perpetuating trafficking.” Even further complicated by the economic niche traffickers fill, US$32 billion worldwide.

As such, the issue is pervasive and ingrained in many Indian socio-economic infrastructures. The scenario worsens, however, when taking into account that India has the third largest HIV/AIDS population in the world. In a recent study of Nepalese girls trafficked into India, then later rescued, 38 percent tested positive for HIV. “Girls trafficked prior to age 15 years had an increased risk for HIV, with 60.6 percent infected.”

Rescue, restoration and justice

Rescue
Targeting towns and cities like Pune, where little work has been done, enables Freedom Firm to critically mitigate the trafficking of individuals from what has become a major human trafficking hub. Despite being the eighth largest city in India, with the third largest red light district, the city of Pune did not attain its first sex trafficking conviction until 2008.

Undercover investigators monitoring red light areas in Maharashtra and Karnataka identify minor-aged girls and their traffickers and brothel keepers, document the crime and submit the information to local authorities; who then make the corresponding arrests and transfer the underage girls, and any adult women who want to leave, to a government facility.

While in the government facility from anywhere between 6 months to 3 years Freedom Firm workers provide counseling, medical care and education. The relationships established by this contact lays the foundation for future rehabilitation and reintegration efforts.

References

Human rights organisations based in India
2006 establishments in India
Organizations established in 2006